The Northern State of Indiana League was a Class D level minor league baseball league that played from 1909 to 1911. The six–team Northern State of Indiana League consisted of teams based in Indiana.

History
The Northern State of Indiana League began minor league play on May 5, 1909 as a Class D level six–team league, under the direction of league president Charles Klunk. The Bluffton Babes, Huntington Johnnies, Kokomo Wild Cats, Lafayette Maroons and Marion Boosters joined the Wabash Whitecaps as charter members of the league. 

At the conclusion of the 1909 Northern State of Indiana League season, there was a tie for first place. The Bluffton Babes with a 65–38 (.631) record and the Lafayette Maroons with a 66–39 record (.629) tied for 1st place in the standings, with the two teams finishing 6.0 games ahead of the 3rd place Huntington Johnnies. The league held no playoffs for its duration. The regular season 1st place team was the Northern State of Indiana League champion.

In 1910, the Northern State of Indiana League was under the direction of presidents Daniel Flanagan and Charles Halderman and began the season with four teams. On July 2, 1910, the Bluffton and Marion franchises joined league play and games played prior to July 1, 1910 were not counted in the standings. The Wabash Rockeries won the league championship with a 46–25 record, finishing 3.5 games ahead of the 2nd place Bluffton Babes.

The 1911 season was the final season of play for the Northern State of Indiana League. Charles Klunk returned as league president as play began on May 24, 1911. During the final season, the Logansport franchise moved to Anderson on July 2, 1911 and Bluffton folded on the same date. The league permanently folded on July 29, 1911. At the time the league folded, the Marion Boosters, with a record of 46–24, finished 6.0 games ahead of the 2nd place Huntington Indians in the six–team league. The Bluffton Babes (31–31), Wabash Rockeries (30–35), Lafayette Farmers (28–37) and Logansport /Anderson Whitecaps (22–40) were the remaining franchises in the last season of play.

Northern State of Indiana League teams

League standings
1909 Northern State of Indiana League 

1910 Northern State of Indiana League

1911 Northern State of Indiana League

References

Defunct minor baseball leagues in the United States
Baseball in Indiana
Baseball leagues in Indiana
1909 establishments in Indiana
1911 disestablishments in Indiana
Sports leagues established in 1909
Sports leagues disestablished in 1911